Kentucky Route 251 (KY 251) is a  state highway in the U.S. state of Kentucky. The highway connects Elizabethtown and Fort Knox with rural areas of Hardin County.

Route description
KY 251 begins at an intersection with U.S. Route 31W (US 31W; West Dixie Avenue) in Elizabethtown, within Hardin County. It travels to the northeast and curves to the north-northeast. It passes Elizabethtown High School, St. James Cemetery, Elizabethtown City Park, and Hardin Memorial Park cemetery. Just before leaving the city limits of the city, it intersects KY 3005 (Ring Road). It curves to the north-northwest and intersects KY 434 (Battle Training Road). Just north of this intersection, the highway enters the boundaries of Fort Knox. It curves to the north-northeast and meets its northern terminus, an intersection with KY 313 (Joe Prather Highway). Here, the roadway continues as Shepherdsville Road, a restricted access road for the fort.

Major intersections

See also

References

0251
Transportation in Hardin County, Kentucky
Elizabethtown, Kentucky
Elizabethtown metropolitan area
Fort Knox